The Porter Cup is a 72-hole, medal-play elite amateur golf tournament held annually at the Niagara Falls Country Club in Lewiston, New York. It was first played in 1959 and over the years has hosted some of the biggest names in golf. Past champions include PGA Tour stars Phil Mickelson, David Duval, Scott Verplank and Ben Crenshaw.

Winners

2022 Carson Bacha
2021 Ben Reichert
2020 Canceled
2019 Aiden Didone
2018 Thomas Walsh
2017 Brandon Wu
2016 Harrison Endycott
2015 Denny McCarthy
2014 Geoff Drakeford
2013 Taylor Pendrith
2012 Richy Werenski
2011 Patrick Rodgers
2010 David Chung
2009 Brendan Gielow
2008 Adam Mitchell
2007 Brian Harman
2006 Seungsu Han
2005 Pablo Martin-Benavides
2004 Spencer Levin
2003 Casey Wittenberg
2002 Simon Nash
2001 Nick Cassini
2000 Christopher Wisler
1999 Hunter Haas
1998 Gene Elliott
1997 John Harris
1996 Joey Snyder III
1995 Ryuji Imada
1994 Allen Doyle
1993 Joey Gullion
1992 David Duval
1991 Gary Nicklaus
1990 Phil Mickelson
1989 Robert Gamez
1988 Tony Mollica
1987 Jay Sigel
1986 Nolan Henke
1985 Scott Verplank
1984 Danny Mijovic
1983 Scott Verplank
1982 Nathaniel Crosby
1981 Jay Sigel
1980 Tony DeLuca
1979 John Cook
1978 Bobby Clampett
1977 Vance Heafner
1976 Scott Simpson
1975 Jay Sigel
1974 George Burns
1973 Vinny Giles
1972 Ben Crenshaw
1971 Ronnie Quinn
1970 Howard Twitty
1969 Gary Cowan
1968 Randy Wolff
1967 Bob E. Smith
1966 Bob E. Smith
1965 Ward Wettlaufer
1964 Deane Beman
1963 Bill Harvey
1962 Ed Tutwiler
1961 John Konsek
1960 Ward Wettlaufer
1959 John Konsek

Source

References

External links
Official site
Amateur golf tournaments in the United States
Golf in New York (state)
Sports competitions in New York (state)